Miska (III) from the kindred Atyusz was a Hungarian noble, who served as ispán of Vas County in 1214.

He was a member of the Atyusz kindred as the son of Miska II, his brother was Judge royal Solomon. He had also several cousins, including the influential lords Atyusz III, Lawrence (sons of Atyusz II) and Sal.

References

Sources

 

Miska III
13th-century Hungarian people